A Faroese Dane is a resident of Denmark with a Faroese ethnic background.

Statistics
In 2006, 21,687 people of Faroese descent were recorded in Denmark, a figure almost half the population of the Faroe Islands.

On average each year, not fewer than 240 Faroese move to Denmark from Faroe Islands, which is about 0.5% of the Faroese population.

See also

Faroe Islanders

References

Faroese people
Ethnic groups in Denmark
Faroese diaspora
Scandinavian diaspora
Danish people of Faroese descent